William James Cunningham  (June 9, 1886 – February 21, 1946) was a second baseman in Major League Baseball. He played for the Washington Senators from 1910 to 1912.

External links

1886 births
1946 deaths
Major League Baseball second basemen
Washington Senators (1901–1960) players
Baseball players from New York (state)
Gloversville-Johnstown Jags players
Elmira Colonels players
New Bedford Whalers (baseball) players
Montreal Royals players
Suffolk Wildcats players